The University System of Tunku Abdul Rahman (USTAR) is the organizational body that includes 4 private institutions of higher learning in Malaysia.  It sets goals to promote vocational education in the country. 

Recently, committee members of USTAR paid a visit to Australia and Taiwan.

List of institutions

See also
Malaysian Technical University Network - An organization body of Malaysia Technical University (MTU)

References

Professional associations based in Malaysia
Educational organisations based in Malaysia
Educational institutions established in 2014
2014 establishments in Malaysia
College and university associations and consortia in Asia